This list, 2017 in paleomalacology, is a list of new taxa of ammonites and other fossil cephalopods, as well as fossil gastropods, bivalves and other molluscs that are scheduled to be described during the year 2017, as well as other significant discoveries and events related to molluscan paleontology that are scheduled to occur in the year 2017.

Ammonites

Research
 A study on the relationship between hatchling size and geographical ranges in ammonites, as well as on the relationship between geological duration and geographical ranges of ammonites, is published by Wani (2017).
 A study on the holotype specimen of the Devonian species Ivoites opitzi, aiming to establish whether sclerobionts settled on the specimen during its life and whether they were responsible for the coiling observed in this specimen, is published by Stilkerich, Smrecak & De Baets (2017).
 Goolaerts, Denayer & Mottequin (2017) interpret the fossils of Ellipsocaris dewalquei and Spathiocaris chagrinensis from the Devonian (Frasnian) of Belgium, originally thought to be crustacean shields, as ammonoid anaptychi, and consider the genus Ellipsocaris to be a junior synonym of the genus Sidetes.
 A study on the inner shell structure in several ammonite taxa from the Triassic (Olenekian) of southern Primorye (Russia) and its implications for the phylogenetic relationships of Early Triassic ammonites is published by Smyshlyaeva & Zakharov (2017).
 An 8.5 m long ammonite drag mark with the preserved shell of Subplanites rueppellianus at its end is described from the Solnhofen limestone (Germany) by Lomax et al. (2017).
 A study on the taxonomic status of the perisphinctid genus Hubertoceras from the Middle Jurassic of India is published by Dutta et al. (2017), who interpret Hubertoceras as a junior synonym and microconch of the genus Obtusicostites.
 A study on the occurrences of Albian ammonite fossils and their implications for the biogeography of Albian ammonites is published by Rojas et al. (2017).

New taxa
{| class="wikitable sortable" align="center" width="100%"
|-
! Name
! Novelty
! Status
! Authors
! Age
! Unit
! Location
! Notes
! Images
|-
|
Aegoceras truemani
|
Sp. nov
|
Valid
|
Faure & Bohain
|
Early Jurassic (Pliensbachian)
|
|

|
|
|-
|
Agathiceras sequaxilirae
|
Sp. nov
|
Valid
|
Zhou
|
Permian
|
Nanpanjiang Basin
|

|
|
|-
|
Akmilleria parahuecoensis
|
Sp. nov
|
Valid
|
Zhou
|
Permian
|
Nanpanjiang Basin
|

|
|
|-
|
Allopharciceras
|
Gen. et 2 sp. nov
|
Valid
|
Bockwinkel, Becker & Aboussalam
|
Devonian (Givetian)
|
|

|
Genus includes new species A. maximum and A. kirchgasseri.
|
|-
|
Ammonitoceras dumasi
|
Sp. nov
|
Valid
|
Delanoy et al.
|
Early Cretaceous (Aptian)
|
|

|
A member of the family Ancyloceratidae.
|
|-
|
Ammonitoceras leiferrasensis
|
Sp. nov
|
Valid
|
Delanoy et al.
|
Early Cretaceous (Aptian)
|
|

|
A member of the family Ancyloceratidae.
|
|-
|
Ammonitoceras madouxi
|
Sp. nov
|
Valid
|
Delanoy et al.
|
Early Cretaceous (Aptian)
|
|

|
A member of the family Ancyloceratidae.
|
|-
|
Arctoceras erebori
|
Sp. nov
|
Valid
|
Piazza in Piazza, Hammer & Jattiot
|
Early Triassic
|
Vikinghøgda Formation
|

|
|
|-
|
Aristoceras liuzhaiense
|
Sp. nov
|
Valid
|
Zhou
|
Permian
|
Nanpanjiang Basin
|

|
|
|-
|
Balticeras samsonowiczi
|
Sp. nov
|
Valid
|
Wierzbowski
|
Late Jurassic (Kimmeridgian)
|
Burzenin Formation
|

|
|
|-
|
Bamyaniceras nandanense
|
Sp. nov
|
Valid
|
Zhou
|
Permian
|
Nanpanjiang Basin
|

|
|
|-
|
Bamyaniceras yangchangense
|
Sp. nov
|
Valid
|
Zhou
|
Permian
|
Nanpanjiang Basin
|

|
|
|-
|
Biloclymenia australis
|
Sp. nov
|
Valid
|
Korn et al.
|
Devonian (Famennian)
|
|

|
|
|-
|
Binelliceras michalíki
|
Sp. nov
|
Valid
|
Vašíček & Malek
|
Early Cretaceous (Hauterivian)
|
|

|
|
|-
|
Brainaella
|
Gen. et sp. nov
|
Valid
|
Frau, Bulot & Delanoy
|
Early Cretaceous (Aptian)
|
|

|
A member of the family Acrioceratidae. The type species is B. marcoulinense.
|
|-
|
Bransonoceras longyinense
|
Sp. nov
|
Valid
|
Zhou
|
Permian
|
Nanpanjiang Basin
|

|
|
|-
|
Calycoceras (Newboldiceras) algeriense
|
Sp. nov
|
Valid
|
Kennedy & Gale
|
Late Cretaceous (Cenomanian)
|
Fahdene Formation
|

|
|
|-
|
Caseyites
|
Gen. et 3 sp. nov
|
Valid
|
Delanoy et al.
|
Early Cretaceous (Aptian)
|
|

|
A member of the family Ancyloceratidae. The type species is C. esteronensis; genus also includes new species C. vermeuleni and C. morenobedmari, possibly also "Epancyloceras" fractum Casey (1960) and "Pseudocrioceras" orbignyanum Ropolo et al. (1998), non Matheron (1842).
|
|-
|
Caspianites ragazziae
|
Sp. nov
|
Valid
|
Delanoy et al.
|
Early Cretaceous (Aptian)
|
|

|
A member of the family Ancyloceratidae.
|
|-
|
Colombiceras hiratai
|
Sp. nov
|
Valid
|
Matsukawa
|
Early Cretaceous (Aptian)
|
Wada Formation
|

|
A member of the subfamily Acanthohoplitinae.
|
|-
|
Craspedites (Craspedites) praeokensis
|
Sp. nov
|
Valid
|
Rogov
|
Late Jurassic
|
|

|
|
|-
|
Craspedites (Trautscholdiceras) transitionis
|
Sp. nov
|
Valid
|
Rogov
|
Late Jurassic
|
|

|
|
|-
|
Cyrtoclymenia nodifera
|
Sp. nov
|
Valid
|
Korn et al.
|
Devonian (Famennian)
|
|

|
|
|-
|
Difuntites furnishi
|
Sp. nov
|
Valid
|
Zhou
|
Permian
|
Nanpanjiang Basin
|

|
|
|-
|
Dombarites clemens
|
Sp. nov
|
Valid
|
Nikolaeva & Konovalova
|
Carboniferous (Mississippian)
|
|

|
|
|-
|
Dorsomorphites
|
Gen. et comb. nov
|
Valid
|
Sarti
|
Late Jurassic (Tithonian)
|
|

|
A member of Ataxioceratidae. The type species is D. exornatum (Catullo, 1853); genus also includes D. negrii (Del Campana, 1905), D. bassanii (Del Campana 1905) and D. selectus (Neumayr, 1873).
|
|-
|
Elsaella
|
Gen. et sp. nov
|
Junior homonym
|
Luber et al.
|
Early Cretaceous (Aptian)
|
Essaouira-Agadir Basin
|

|
Genus includes new species E. tiskatinensis. The generic name is preoccupied by Elsaella Alichova (1960).
|
|-
|
Emilites globosus
|
Sp. nov
|
Valid
|
Zhou
|
Permian
|
Nanpanjiang Basin
|

|
|
|-
|
Eoaraxoceras spinosai
|
Sp. nov
|
Valid
|
Zhou
|
Permian
|
Nanpanjiang Basin
|

|
|
|-
|
Eubostrychoceras (Eubostrychoceras) salisburgense
|
Sp. nov
|
Valid
|
Summesberger, Kennedy & Skoumal
|
Late Cretaceous (Santonian)
|
Gosau Group
|

|
|
|-
|
Eubostrychoceras valdelaxum
|
Sp. nov
|
Valid
|
Aiba et al.
|
Late Cretaceous (Campanian)
|
|

|
|
|-
|
Eumedlicottia kabiensis
|
Sp. nov
|
Valid
|
Zhou
|
Permian
|
Nanpanjiang Basin
|

|
|
|-
|
Exiteloceras (Exiteloceras) densicostatum
|
Sp. nov
|
Valid
|
McLachlan & Haggart
|
Late Cretaceous (Campanian)
|
Northumberland Formation
|
()
|
|
|-
|
Extropharciceras worki
|
Sp. nov
|
Valid
|
Bockwinkel, Becker & Aboussalam
|
Devonian (Givetian)
|
|

|
|
|-
|
Ferganoceras constrictum
|
Sp. nov
|
Valid
|
Nikolaeva & Konovalova
|
Carboniferous (Mississippian)
|
|

|
|
|-
|
Forbesiceras reversum
|
Sp. nov
|
Valid
|
Kennedy & Gale
|
Late Cretaceous (Cenomanian)
|
Fahdene Formation
|

|
|
|-
|
Fusicrimites
|
Gen. et sp. nov
|
Valid
|
Zhou
|
Permian
|
Nanpanjiang Basin
|

|
Genus includes new species F. nanpanjiangensis.
|
|-
|
Glenisterites
|
Gen. et sp. nov
|
Valid
|
Zhou
|
Permian
|
Nanpanjiang Basin
|

|
Genus includes new species G. sidazhaiensis.
|
|-
|
Gonioclymenia ali
|
Sp. nov
|
Valid
|
Korn & Bockwinkel
|
Devonian (Famennian)
|
|

|
|
|-
|
Gonioclymenia asperornata
|
Sp. nov
|
Valid
|
Korn
|
Late Devonian
|
|

|
|
|-
|
Gonioclymenia ebbighauseni
|
Sp. nov
|
Valid
|
Korn & Bockwinkel
|
Devonian (Famennian)
|
|

|
|
|-
|
Gonioclymenia facetornata
|
Sp. nov
|
Valid
|
Korn
|
Late Devonian
|
|

|
|
|-
|
Gonioclymenia inornata
|
Sp. nov
|
Valid
|
Korn & Bockwinkel
|
Devonian (Famennian)
|
|

|
|
|-
|
Gonioclymenia mediornata
|
Sp. nov
|
Valid
|
Korn
|
Late Devonian
|
|

|
|
|-
|
Gonioclymenia parabolica
|
Sp. nov
|
Valid
|
Korn
|
Late Devonian
|
|

|
|
|-
|
Gonioclymenia pricei
|
Sp. nov
|
Valid
|
Korn
|
Late Devonian
|
|

|
|
|-
|
Gonioclymenia spiniger
|
Sp. nov
|
Valid
|
Korn & Bockwinkel
|
Devonian (Famennian)
|
|

|
|
|-
|
Gonioclymenia wendti
|
Sp. nov
|
Valid
|
Korn & Bockwinkel
|
Devonian (Famennian)
|
|

|
|
|-
|
Gonioclymenia wunderlichi
|
Sp. nov
|
Valid
|
Korn
|
Late Devonian
|
|

|
|
|-
|
Hypengonoceras faugeresi
|
Sp. nov
|
Valid
|
Benzaggagh et al.
|
Early Cretaceous (Albian)
|
El Mizab Formation
|

|
|
|-
|
Hypergoniatites kardailovkensis
|
Sp. nov
|
Valid
|
Nikolaeva & Konovalova
|
Carboniferous (Mississippian)
|
|

|
|
|-
|
Kachpurites involutus
|
Sp. nov
|
Valid
|
Rogov
|
Late Jurassic
|
|

|
|
|-
|
Kachpurites tenuicostatus
|
Sp. nov
|
Valid
|
Rogov
|
Late Jurassic
|
|

|
|
|-
|
Kepplerites herscheli
|
Sp. nov
|
Valid
|
Mönnig & Dietl
|
Middle Jurassic
|
|
|
|
|-
|
Keppleritiana
|
Gen. et 2 sp. nov
|
Junior synonym
|
Mitta
|
Middle Jurassic (Upper Bajocian)
|
|
()
|
A member of the family Stephanoceratidae belonging to the subfamily Garantianinae. The type species is K. rostovtsevi; genus also includes K. graebensteini. Subsequently Mitta (2021) considered Keppleritiana to be a junior synonym of Orthogarantiana.
|
|-
|
Linguaclymenia phillipsi
|
Sp. nov
|
Valid
|
Korn et al.
|
Devonian (Famennian)
|
|

|
|
|-
|
Lithancylus bifurcatus
|
Sp. nov
|
Valid
|
Delanoy et al.
|
Early Cretaceous (Aptian)
|
|

|
A member of the family Ancyloceratidae.
|
|-
|
Loyezia
|
Gen. et sp. et comb. nov
|
Valid
|
Leroy et al.
|
Early Cretaceous
|
|

|
A member of the family Crioceratitidae. The type species is L. coluccii; genus also includes L. krenkeli (Sarkar, 1955), L. shankariae (Sarkar, 1955), and L. crimensis (Wiedmann, 1962).
|
|-
|Malladaites sandovali|
Sp. nov
|
Valid
|
Dietze et al.|
Middle Jurassic (Aalenian)
|
|

|
|
|-
|Medioclymenia saourensis|
Sp. nov
|
Valid
|
Korn et al.|
Devonian (Famennian)
|
|

|
|
|-
|Metahoplites postnodosum|
Sp. nov
|
Valid
|
Vermeulen et al.|
Early Cretaceous (Barremian)
|
|

|
A member of the family Holcodiscidae.
|
|-
|Metaperrinites shaiwaensis|
Sp. nov
|
Valid
|
Zhou
|
Permian
|
Nanpanjiang Basin
|

|
|
|-
|Miklukhoceras guizhouense|
Sp. nov
|
Valid
|
Zhou
|
Permian
|
Nanpanjiang Basin
|

|
|
|-
|Mimimitoceras callumbilicum|
Sp. nov
|
Valid
|
Korn et al.|
Devonian (Famennian)
|
|

|
|
|-
|Mimosphinctes karltschanzi|
Sp. nov
|
Valid
|
Klug
|
Early Devonian
|
|

|
|
|-
|Muessenbiaergia beniabbesensis|
Sp. nov
|
Valid
|
Korn et al.|
Devonian (Famennian)
|
|

|
|
|-
|Muessenbiaergia ouarouroutensis|
Sp. nov
|
Valid
|
Korn et al.|
Devonian (Famennian)
|
|

|
|
|-
|Muramotoceras costatum|
Sp. nov
|
Valid
|
Summesberger, Kennedy & Skoumal
|
Late Cretaceous (Santonian)
|
Gosau Group
|

|
|
|-
|Neocrimites guizhouensis|
Sp. nov
|
Valid
|
Zhou
|
Permian
|
Nanpanjiang Basin
|

|
|
|-
|Neocrioceras (Neocrioceras) gosaviense|
Sp. nov
|
Valid
|
Summesberger, Kennedy & Skoumal
|
Late Cretaceous (Santonian)
|
Gosau Group
|

|
A member of the family Diplomoceratidae.
|
|-
|Neopronorites leonovae|
Sp. nov
|
Valid
|
Zhou
|
Permian
|
Nanpanjiang Basin
|

|
|
|-
|Nostoceras (Didymoceras?) adrotans|
Sp. nov
|
Valid
|
McLachlan & Haggart
|
Late Cretaceous (Campanian)
|
Northumberland Formation
|
()
|
|
|-
|Oxypharciceras|
Gen. et sp. nov
|
Valid
|
Bockwinkel, Becker & Aboussalam
|
Devonian (Givetian)
|
|

|
Genus includes new species O. chebbiense.
|
|-
|Pachyerymnoceras mahipati|
Sp. nov
|
Valid
|
Jain
|
Middle Jurassic (Callovian)
|
|

|
|
|-
|Palominoceras|
Gen. et comb. nov
|
Valid
|
Jattiot & Bucher in Jattiot et al.|
Early Triassic
|
Thaynes Group
|
()
|
A member of the family Xenoceltitidae; a new genus for "Xenodiscus (Xenaspis)" nevadanus Smith (1932).
|
|-
|Parahedenstroemia petkovici|
Sp. nov
|
Valid
|
Đaković
|
Early Triassic
|
|

|
A member of the family Hedenstroemiidae.
|
|-
|Parasteroceras beniderkouli|
Sp. nov
|
Valid
|
Dommergues & Meister
|
Early Jurassic
|
|

|
A member of the family Arietitidae belonging to the subfamily Asteroceratinae.
|
|-
|Pharciceras concurrens|
Sp. nov
|
Valid
|
Bockwinkel, Becker & Aboussalam
|
Devonian (Givetian)
|
|

|
|
|-
|Pharciceras elevatum|
Sp. nov
|
Valid
|
Bockwinkel, Becker & Aboussalam
|
Devonian (Givetian)
|
|

|
|
|-
|Popanoceras ziyunense|
Sp. nov
|
Valid
|
Zhou
|
Permian
|
Nanpanjiang Basin
|

|
|
|-
|Proaustraliceras bournaudi|
Sp. nov
|
Valid
|
Delanoy et al.|
Early Cretaceous (Aptian)
|
|

|
A member of the family Ancyloceratidae.
|
|-
|Properrinites gigantus|
Sp. nov
|
Valid
|
Zhou
|
Permian
|
Nanpanjiang Basin
|

|
|
|-
|Pseudoflemingites martellii|
Sp. nov
|
Valid
|
Đaković
|
Early Triassic
|
|

|
A member of Ceratitida belonging to the group Meekocerataceae and the family Flemingitidae.
|
|-
|Pseudohaploceras tosaense|
Sp. nov
|
Valid
|
Matsukawa
|
Early Cretaceous (Aptian)
|
Wada Formation
|

|
A member of the family Desmoceratidae.
|
|-
|Pseudolioceras (Paratugurites)|
Sub gen. et sp. nov
|
Valid
|
Repin
|
Middle Jurassic (Aalenian)
|
|

|
The type species of the subgenus is Pseudolioceras (Paratugurites) ochoticum.
|
|-
|Pseudolioceras (Pontolioceras)|
Sub gen. et sp. nov
|
Valid
|
Repin
|
Middle Jurassic (Aalenian)
|
|

|
The type species of the subgenus is Pseudolioceras (Pontolioceras) pontoneicum.
|
|-
|Pseudolioceras (Pseudolioceras) beyrichi orientale|
Subsp. nov
|
|
Repin
|
Middle Jurassic (Aalenian)
|
|

|
|
|-
|Pseudolioceras (Pseudolioceras) kegaliense|
Sp. nov
|
|
Repin
|
Middle Jurassic
|
|

|
|
|-
|Pseudolioceras (Pseudolioceras) motortschunense|
Sp. nov
|
Valid
|
Repin
|
Early Jurassic (Toarcian)
|
|

|
|
|-
|Pseudolioceras (Pseudolioceras) parakedonense|
Sp. nov
|
|
Repin
|
Early Jurassic (Toarcian)
|
|

|
|
|-
|Pseudolioceras (Pseudolioceras) planum|
Sp. nov
|
Valid
|
Repin
|
Early Jurassic (Toarcian)
|
|

|
|
|-
|Pseudolioceras (Pseudolioceras) rosenkrantzi startense|
Subsp. nov
|
Valid
|
Repin
|
Early Jurassic (Toarcian)
|
|

|
|
|-
|Pseudolioceras (Pseudolioceras) rosenkrantzi transiens|
Subsp. nov
|
Valid
|
Repin
|
Early Jurassic (Toarcian)
|
|

|
|
|-
|Pseudopallasiceras|
Gen. et comb. nov
|
Valid
|
Sarti
|
Late Jurassic (Tithonian)
|
|

|
A member of Ataxioceratidae. The type species is "Subplanitoides" mediterraneus Cecca (1990); genus also includes P. toucasi (Cecca & Enay, 1991) and possibly P? pouzinensis (Toucas, 1890).
|
|-
|?Pseudosageceras bullatum|
Sp. nov
|
Valid
|
Jattiot & Bucher in Jattiot et al.|
Early Triassic
|
Thaynes Group
|
()
|
A member of the family Hedenstroemiidae.
|
|-
|Pseudosubplanitoides|
Gen. et comb. nov
|
Valid
|
Sarti
|
Late Jurassic (Tithonian)
|
|

|
A member of Ataxioceratidae. The type species is "Usseliceras (Subplanitoides)" apenninicum Cecca (1990); genus also includes P. pseudocontiguus (Donze & Enay, 1961 in Cecca, 1990), P. schwertschlageri (Zeiss, 1968), P. oppeli (Zeiss, 1968) and P. spindelense (Zeiss, 1968).
|
|-
|Pseudoteloceras digbyi|
Sp. nov
|
Valid
|
Chandler, Dietze & Whicher
|
Middle Jurassic (early Bajocian)
|
|

|
A member of the family Stephanoceratidae.
|
|-
|Radioceras? tabulatum|
Sp. nov
|
Valid
|
Đaković
|
Early Triassic
|
|

|
A member of Ceratitida belonging to the group Meekocerataceae and the family Gyronitidae.
|
|-
|Rarecostites kyafarensis|
Sp. nov
|
Valid
|
Mitta
|
Middle Jurassic (Bajocian)
|
|
()
|
A member of the family Parkinsoniidae.
|
|-
|Rarecostites sherstyukovi|
Sp. nov
|
Valid
|
Mitta
|
Middle Jurassic (Bajocian)
|
|
()
|
A member of the family Parkinsoniidae.
|
|-
|Rasenioides glazeki|
Sp. nov
|
Valid
|
Wierzbowski
|
Late Jurassic (Kimmeridgian)
|
Burzenin Formation
|

|
A member of the family Aulacostephanidae.
|
|-
|Solenoceras exornatus|
Sp. nov
|
Valid
|
McLachlan & Haggart
|
Late Cretaceous (Campanian)
|
Northumberland Formation
|
()
|
|
|-
|Spathites (Jeanrogericeras) asflaensis|
Sp. nov
|
Valid
|
Meister et al.|
Late Cretaceous (Early Turonian)
|
|

|
|-
|Stacheoceras shaiwaense|
Sp. nov
|
Valid
|
Zhou
|
Permian
|
Nanpanjiang Basin
|

|
|
|-
|Subanarcestes aristanensis|
Sp. nov
|
Valid
|
Nikolaeva in Nikolaeva et al.|
Devonian (Eifelian)
|
|

|
|
|-
|Svetlanoceras uraloceraformis|
Sp. nov
|
Valid
|
Zhou
|
Permian
|
Nanpanjiang Basin
|

|
|
|-
|Synartinskia meyaoense|
Sp. nov
|
Valid
|
Zhou
|
Permian
|
Nanpanjiang Basin
|

|
|
|-
|Uptonia atlantica|
Sp. nov
|
Valid
|
Faure & Bohain
|
Early Jurassic (Pliensbachian)
|
|

|
|
|-
|Virgatites rarecostatus|
Sp. nov
|
Valid
|
Rogov
|
Late Jurassic
|
|

|
|
|-
|Virgatomorphites|
Gen. et sp. nov
|
Valid
|
Sarti
|
Late Jurassic (Tithonian)
|
Rosso Ammonitico Veronese Formation
|

|
A member of Ataxioceratidae. The type species is V. pseudorothpletzi.
|
|-
|Xenosphinctes|
Gen. et sp. nov
|
Valid
|
Scherzinger & Schweigert
|
Late Jurassic (Tithonian)
|
Hangende-Bankkalke Formation
|

|
A member of the family Ataxioceratidae. The type species is X. berkai.
|
|-
|}

Other cephalopods

Research
 A study on the phylogeny and timing of cephalopod (especially coleoid) evolution is published by Tanner et al. (2017).
 A cephalopod beak assigned to an unnamed shelled coleoid of a so far unknown high-level taxonomic group, displaying significant similarity to the lower beak of the vampire squid, is described from the Carboniferous (late Viséan) Moorefield Formation (Arkansas, United States) by Doguzhaeva & Mapes (2017).
 A study on the global diversity of cephalopods during the early Late Cretaceous is published by Yacobucci (2017).

New taxa

Gastropods

Other molluscs

Research
 A study on the shell microstructure of the specimens of the Cambrian micromollusk species Pelagiella madianensis recovered from the Xinji Formation (China) is published by Li et al. (2017).
 Mass accumulations of large bivalves are reported at the oldest-known, Silurian methane seep near El Borj (Morocco) by Jakubowicz, Hryniewicz & Bełka (2017).
 Foam oysters belonging to the genus Liostrea'', found attached to the ammonoid shells, are described from the Early Triassic of Greenland, India and Pakistan by Hautmann, Ware & Bucher (2017).

New taxa

References

Molluscs described in 2017
2017 in paleontology
Paleomalacology